Valiyan or Veleyan may refer to:
Valian (disambiguation), places in Iran
Battle of Valiyan (1221)